The Hilton Baton Rouge Capitol Center is a historic hotel in Baton Rouge, Louisiana, originally built in 1927 as the Heidelberg Hotel.  It was listed on the National Register of Historic Places in 1982.  The Heidelberg Hotel was a favorite dwelling of Louisiana Governor Huey Long, who had a fourth-floor suite. For a time it was known as the Capitol House Hotel, when under the management of former State Representative Chris Faser, Jr. Huey P. Long, John F. Kennedy, Hubert Humphrey, Jimmy Carter, Will Rogers, and Fidel Castro were all guests of the hotel.

The hotel closed in 1985, and was mostly derelict until 2005. It reopened after a $70 million renovation on August 30, 2006, as the Hilton Baton Rouge Capitol Center. the hotel was also inducted into Historic Hotels of America, the official program of the National Trust for Historic Preservation, since 2007.

The hotel's NRHP listing was increased in 2008 to include the Hotel King across the street and the listing was renamed Heidelberg Hotel and Hotel King .

See also
National Register of Historic Places listings in East Baton Rouge Parish, Louisiana

References

External links

Hotel buildings on the National Register of Historic Places in Louisiana
Hotels established in 1927
Hotel buildings completed in 1927
Capitol Center
Hotels in Louisiana
Buildings and structures in Baton Rouge, Louisiana
National Register of Historic Places in Baton Rouge, Louisiana
2006 establishments in Louisiana
Historic Hotels of America